The Shire of Moorabool is a local government area in Victoria, Australia, located in the western part of the state. It includes the towns of Ballan, Bacchus Marsh, Balliang, Mount Wallace, Myrniong, Blackwood, Greendale, Gordon, Korweinguboora and Mount Egerton, Bungaree, Elaine and Wallace. It was formed in 1994 from the amalgamation of the Shire of Bacchus Marsh, Shire of Ballan and parts of the Shire of Bungaree and City of Werribee.

The Shire is governed and administered by the Moorabool Shire Council; its seat of local government and administrative centre is located at the council headquarters in Ballan, it also has service centres located in Bacchus Marsh and Darley. The Shire is named after the Moorabool River, a major geographical feature that meanders through the area, which is named after the Wathawurrung word moo-roo-bul referring to Bunyip-like creature that lives in the river.

Council

Current composition
The council is composed of four wards and seven councillors, with four councillors elected to represent the East Moorabool Ward and one councillor per remaining ward elected to represent each of the other wards. Council Composition as of September 2022:

Administration and governance
The council meets in the council chambers at the council headquarters in the Ballan Municipal Offices, which is also the location of the council's administrative activities. It also provides customer services at both its administrative centre in Ballan, and its service centre in Bacchus Marsh.

Townships and localities
The 2021 census, the shire had a population of 37,632 up from 31,818 in the 2016 census

^ - Territory divided with another LGA

References

External links 
 
Metlink local public transport map 
Link to Land Victoria interactive maps

Local government areas of Victoria (Australia)
Grampians (region)